David Chapman (born 22 March 1965) is an Australian sport shooter who has competed at two Olympic Games.  He has competed in the 25 metre rapid fire pistol at the 2000 Summer Olympics in Sydney, finishing in 20th place.  He returned to the Olympic team for the 2012 London Olympics where he competed in the same event, finishing 18th.

His daughter Hayley Chapman also competed at London, in the 25 metre pistol event.

References

External links

 Australian Olympic Committee profile

1965 births
Living people
Australian male sport shooters
Shooters at the 2000 Summer Olympics
Shooters at the 2012 Summer Olympics
Shooters at the 2016 Summer Olympics
Olympic shooters of Australia
Commonwealth Games silver medallists for Australia
Commonwealth Games gold medallists for Australia
Shooters at the 2006 Commonwealth Games
Shooters at the 2010 Commonwealth Games
Commonwealth Games bronze medallists for Australia
Shooters at the 2014 Commonwealth Games
Commonwealth Games medallists in shooting
20th-century Australian people
21st-century Australian people
Medallists at the 2006 Commonwealth Games
Medallists at the 2010 Commonwealth Games
Medallists at the 2014 Commonwealth Games